The Ambassador Extraordinary and Plenipotentiary of the Russian Federation to the Republic of Uzbekistan is the official representative of the President and the Government of the Russian Federation to the President and the Government of Uzbekistan.

The ambassador and his staff work at large in the Embassy of Russia in Tashkent.

History of diplomatic relations

With the dissolution of the Soviet Union in 1991, diplomatic relations between the Russian Federation and the Republic of Uzbekistan were first established on 20 March 1992.

Representatives of the Russian Federation to the Republic of Uzbekistan (1992 – present)

References

 
Uzbekistan
Russia